The Old Oregon Trail Highway was an auto trail roughly following the Oregon Trail from Independence, Missouri to Seaside, Oregon and Olympia, Washington. In the U.S. Highway system, it became:
US 40, Kansas City to Wamego (now partly US 24)
No through road, Wamego to Grand Island via Marysville, Fairbury, Hebron, and Hastings
US 30, Grand Island to Ogallala
US 26, Ogallala to Dwyer
US 185, Dwyer to Orin (now US 87)
US 20, Orin to Casper
US 87E, Casper to Muddy Gap (now WYO 220)
No through road, Muddy Gap to Granger
US 30N, Granger to Cotterel (now US 30)
US 30, Cotterel to Astoria
US 101, Astoria to Seaside
US 99, Portland to Olympia (now I-5)

The name is still used in Oregon for Interstate 84 east of U.S. Route 730, which is named the Old Oregon Trail Highway No. 6 (see Oregon highways and routes).

Auto trails in the United States